Duxbury High School is a public high school located in the town of Duxbury, Massachusetts, United States, and operating in the Duxbury Public School District. The superintendent of the Duxbury Public School District is Danielle Klingaman, the assistant superintendent is Beth Wilcox and the principal of Duxbury High School is Todd Warmington. The building that houses the Duxbury Middle and High School is located at 71 Alden Street, Duxbury, MA and was newly constructed in 2014. The Duxbury High School mascot is the Dragons and its school colors are green, white, and silver.

Demographics 
The 2020 total school population was 981 students, a figure 2% less than enrollment in 2019 and 6% less than enrollment in 2018.

Of the total number of students enrolled in Duxbury High School in 2020, 17.3% are High Need Students, 5.9% are Economically Disadvantaged, 0.3% are English Language Learners, 12.3% are Disabled, 0.3% are African-American, 1.4% are Asian-American, 2.1% are Hispanic, 3.0% are Multiracial, and 93.1% are White.

Of the 78 full-time teaching staff, 99.2% are licensed teachers and 89.2% are licensed teachers in the subject they teach.

Academics

Ratings
In 2011, Duxbury High School was ranked #13 of all public Massachusetts high schools and #272 of national public high schools by U.S. News & World Report, while Boston Magazine ranked Duxbury High School #27 among 150 greater-Boston public high schools in the same year.

In 2017, U.S. News & World Report ranked the school #17 in Massachusetts and #271 nationally, while Boston Magazine ranked it #47 among greater-Boston area public high schools. The Massachusetts Department of Education placed Duxbury High School in the 92nd percentile of Massachusetts public high schools in 2017. 

In 2020, the Massachusetts DoE classified Duxbury High School as a "School of Recognition" overall, placing it in the 99th percentile of public high schools in Massachusetts.

Opportunities
71.8% of students have access to participate in an arts course. 83.1% of 11th and 12th grade students have completed at least one advanced course, including Advanced Placement. 95.9% of 9th grade students pass all of their courses. 100% of students complete the MassCore program of studies.

Standardized test performance
Students who take the SAT averaged a score of 590 in Reading and 591 in Math in 2017. Students who scored a passing grade of 3 or higher on Advanced Placement examinations accounted for 73% in 2017. Students in the 10th grade who met or exceeded expectations on the MCAS ELA, Math, and Science portions numbered 89%, 86%, and 97%, respectively.

Funding
The total dollars spent per student amounted to $16,037 in 2020, $15,960 of which (all except $77) came from local and state funds.

Post-secondary preparedness
The four-year graduation rate is 98.8%, with 86.1% matriculating to a 4-year university and 2% matriculating to a 2-year university.

Athletics
The Duxbury Dragons have won the following state championships.

Fall

 Football: 2005(2A), 2008(2A), 2010(2A), 2011(2), 2016(2) & 2022(4) (Division in Parenthesis)
 Boys’ Golf: 1988, 1989, 1996, 2000, 2007, 2010, and 2011
 Boys’ Soccer: 1976, 1978, 1981, 1984, 1985, 1989, 1995, 2000, and 2001 
 Girls’ Soccer: 1984, 1995, and 2009

Winter
 Boys’ Basketball: 1989, 1994, and 2006
 Girls’ Basketball: 1998 and 2015 
 Boys Hockey: 2000, 2005, 2007 and 2019
 Girls Hockey: 2011, 2012, 2013, 2014 and 2023
 Girls' Swimming: 2017,2018 and 2020

Spring
 Boys’ Lacrosse: 2002, 2004, 2005, 2006, 2007, 2008, 2009, 2011, and 2012
 Girls’ Lacrosse: 2007
 Girls’ Golf: 2001 
 Sailing: New England Team Racing Champions 2009, Herreshoff Trophy (Women's New England Fleet Racing Championship) 2013
 Boys' Crew::2018
 Girls' Crew: 2018
 Girls’ Track: 1986
 Boys’ Tennis: 1981, 1984, 1990, 1994, and 2013

History
The first high school in Duxbury was established as a private secondary school on Tremont and Depot Streets at the behest of U.S. Congressman George Partridge in 1844. A public high school in the town of Duxbury was first proposed in 1866. Public secondary education in Duxbury was originally conducted in privately-owned buildings throughout the town. The town was unable to afford teachers' salaries from the outset. In 1868, an agreement between the Partridge Academy Trustees and the Town of Duxbury was reached, which allowed Duxbury's high school-age residents to attend the Partridge Academy. The Duxbury High School football team was established in the 1925-1926 school year, while schooling continued at Partridge Academy.

In 1927, a new high school building was constructed at 77 Alden Street for $85,000. The building served as the location of the Duxbury Ellison High School until 1997, when the Duxbury Free Library moved from the Wright Building to occupy 77 Alden Street. The Duxbury High School moved in 1997 to Saint George Street, where it remained until 2013, when the building was razed and replaced with playing fields. The present building housing the high school is located at 71 Alden Street.

Notable alumni
 Peter Chandler, class of 1971, professional soccer player
Peter Teravainen, class of 1973, former professional golfer
Stet Howland, class of 1978, professional rock and metal drummer
Juliana Hatfield, class of 1985, indie rock singer
Bill Curley, class of 1990, NBA forward and Boston College athletic Hall-of-Famer
Will Miller, class of 2002, Team USA 2012 Olympic Games, 4th in men's eight rowing
Chris Ajemian, class of 2005, professional lacrosse player with the Boston Cannons
 Max Quinzani, class of 2006, MLL player

Controversy

Duxbury High School Football Program
During a March 12, 2021 game against rival Plymouth North High School, Duxbury High School football players were heard using anti-Semitic words and potentially other derogatory language as part of their play-calling system. The incident sparked international and national attention in the weeks following its discovery and elicited public statements from virtually every party to the incident, including the Anti-Defamation League. By March 24, 2021, Head Coach Dave Maimaron had been terminated in his position at the Duxbury High School football program and placed on paid administrative leave in his position as a special education instructor at the Duxbury High School. Duxbury Public Schools Superintendent John Antonucci announced that an investigation into the etiology and pervasiveness of anti-Semitic or otherwise offensive language was underway and contracted to Just Training Solutions, LLC by March 24th. 

On June 7, 2021, the results of the investigation conducted by Just Training Solutions, LLC were submitted in a 56-page document to Superintendent John Antonucci, who summarized the report in a document made publicly available on June 10, 2021. The investigation concluded that anti-Semitic language and references to the Holocaust by members of the Duxbury High School football program were in violation of the School District’s Vision-Values-Mission-Goals Policy, its Harassment Policy, and its Staff Conduct Policy. These violations took the form of using the words "Auschwitz," "Rabbi," and "Dreidel" to call plays at the line-of-scrimmage since 2010-2012. Additionally, the report concluded, "Coaching staff engaged in profane and vulgar language and condoned the use of profane and vulgar language by students." Finally, the report concluded that the football program violated the aforementioned School District policies in addition to the School Ceremonies and Observance Policy inasmuch as Catholic worship and prayer was integrated into the football program's preparation for competitions.

Mr. Maimaron submitted his resignation from his teaching position at Duxbury Public Schools to Superintendent Antonucci on June 7, 2021.

Administrative Aftermath 
In June 2021, Duxbury High School Principal Jim Donovan announced that the contract of Thom Holdgate, who has been the school's Director of Athletics and Wellness for 19 years, would not be continued into the 2021-2022 school year.

Joseph Foley, et al. vs. Duxbury Public Schools, et al. 
Joseph Parker Foley was a graduate of the Duxbury Public Schools who died of an accidental drug overdose at the age of 27 years old in October 2020. As a sixth-grade student of Duxbury Middle School in 2006, Mr. Foley's gym teacher was John Blake, a middle school physical education instruction and long-time varsity men's hockey coach.

On March 31, 2021, the Estate of Mr. Foley filed a civil lawsuit in Plymouth Superior Court against the Duxbury Public Schools and John Blake, seeking $1MM in damages. In the suit, the estate of Mr. Foley alleged that Mr. Blake repeatedly sexually abused the sixth-grader, Mr. Foley, beginning in 2006 during gym class, while it named the Duxbury Public Schools as grossly negligent, reckless, and/or callously indifferent about their student, Mr. Foley's, health, welfare, and safety. Mr. Foley's subsequent drug use and accidentally lethal overdose was noted as a result of the sexual abuse he suffered as a Duxbury Middle School student at the hands of his teacher.

By April 2021, the Duxbury Public Schools terminated Mr. Blake's more-than two-decade career as an educator and coach. An independent investigation commissioned by the Duxbury School Department found that the allegations against Mr. Blake, including his sexual abuse of Mr. Foley and his sexual relationship with a colleague, were credible and in violation of the staff code of conduct.

The suit was removed to the United States District Court for the District of Massachusetts that same month, upon the petition of the school district's attorneys, Pierce Davis & Perritano LLP.

As of December 2022, Joseph Morgan, attorney for the estate of Mr. Foley, announced that plaintiffs reached a monetary settlement with the Duxbury Public Schools.

References

External links

Duxbury Public Schools website
Duxbury School District Profile

Educational institutions established in 1959
Schools in Plymouth County, Massachusetts
Duxbury, Massachusetts
Public high schools in Massachusetts
1959 establishments in Massachusetts